Escort for Hire is a low budget 1960 British thriller film. It starred June Thorburn, Pete Murray, Noel Trevarthen, Jan Holden and Peter Butterworth.

Plot
Unemployed actor Steve gets a job with Miss Kennedy's agency as an escort-bodyguard, but ends up being framed for murder after a wealthy client, Miss Elizabeth Quinn, is killed.

Cast
June Thorburn as Terry
Pete Murray as Buzz
Noel Trevarthen as Steve
Jan Holden as Elizabeth
Peter Butterworth as Inspector Bruce
Guy Middleton as Arthur Vickers
Mary Laura Wood as Barbara
Derek Blomfield as Jack
Jill Melford as Nadia
Patricia Plunkett as Eldon Baker
Catherine Ellison as Receptionist
Bruce Beeby as Detective Sergeant Moore
C. Denier Warren as Porter
Viola Keats as Marion
Totti Truman Taylor as Temperance Lady

Critical reception
TV Guide wrote, "this routine British crime melodrama is slightly enhanced by Technicolor."

References

External links

1960 films
1960s crime thriller films
British crime thriller films
Films directed by Godfrey Grayson
Films set in London
Films shot at New Elstree Studios
1960s English-language films
1960s British films